Jesús Seba Hernández (born 11 April 1974) is a Spanish former footballer who played mostly as a forward.

Mostly associated to Real Zaragoza, he was also known as one of the 'Three Amigos', the collective name given to the first three Spanish footballers to play in the English Football League as he had signed with Wigan Athletic. He also played professionally in Portugal, with Chaves and Belenenses.

Club career

Zaragoza
Seba was born in Zaragoza, Aragon. He made his professional – and La Liga – debut at the age of 18 for local Real Zaragoza, in a 1–1 draw against Real Sociedad. He would garner praise for his early performances, ultimately leading to a call-up for the Spain under-21 team – notably scoring twice against Boldklubben Frem in the 1992–93 UEFA Cup (eventual 6–1 aggregate win).

However, in March 1993, Seba suffered a serious ankle tear when attempting a turn in a Copa del Rey match. The injury would stunt his development and later prove a turning point in his career, as he would figure sparingly in top-flight football in the following seasons.

After a loan in Segunda División with Villarreal CF, Seba was released by Zaragoza and moved on a free transfer to England's Wigan Athletic, for the start of the 1995–96 campaign.

Wigan Athletic
Seba came to Wigan as one of the 'Three Amigos', alongside Roberto Martínez – also his teammate at Zaragoza – and Isidro Díaz, drafted in by new chairman Dave Whelan in the summer of 1995; the signings were a real coup for an English Third Division side, especially considering Football League teams rarely searched for talent abroad in the mid-90s and that Seba was also an under-21 international. 'Jesus is a Wiganer' was an early joke at the club, and Spanish flags adorned Springfield Park on matchdays as Spanish fever gripped the town's football supporters.

Seba scored his first goal with his first touch in a pre-season friendly, and played his first competitive game in the season opener against Gillingham. His first official goal arrived in his first match at home (also league), a 2–1 defeat of Scunthorpe United.

Following a series of good results, aided by a string of impressive performances from Seba, Wigan were made early favourites for the championship. Mid-season, however, he found himself on the fringes of the first team, and with their league position only 'satisfactory', Graham Barrow was sacked following a 6–2 loss at Mansfield Town; caretaker manager Frank Lord reinstated the player to the first team, and oversaw a 4–0 win over Exeter City in which the latter scored twice.

Seba was immediately dropped by new manager John Deehan, however, and would later see his appearances limited to mainly substitute roles as he struggled to find form in the latter half of the campaign. He made just two appearances, both from the bench, and played his final game for Wigan on 7 September 1996, 30 minutes against Scunthorpe.

Seba then had trials at Burnley and Bristol Rovers, before being allowed to leave the club by Deehan in October 1996, having started 11 times. He found it most difficult to settle of the three Spaniards, and his struggle to grasp the English language was another contributory factor in his departure.

Spain return and Portugal
Seba returned to his country and Zaragoza in the 1997 January transfer window, but spent almost two years appearing for the reserve team, only playing for the main squad during the 1–3 home loss to SD Compostela in the final day of the season. He then had a four-year spell in Portugal, playing for G.D. Chaves and C.F. Os Belenenses, where a heart condition whilst with the latter put his career on hold.

Seba eventually recovered, but spent his later years in Segunda División B (Orihuela CF, CF Palencia) or lower; during his four-year stint at amateur Andorra CF, he served as captain and was a highly popular figure.

After considering retirement at the end of 2008–09, Seba decided to return to CD Oliver. Upon joining, he expressed his desire to finish his career at the club at which he began more than 20 years earlier.

International career
As well as playing three matches for the Spanish under-21s, Seba appeared twice for the Aragon autonomous side, against Castile and León in 2002 and Chile on 28 December 2006. The latter, a 1–0 victory, was their first fixture against a FIFA-accredited international team.

Personal life
Seba was married with two daughters, and his former teammates Martínez and Xavi Aguado ranked amongst his closest friends.

References

External links

1974 births
Living people
Spanish footballers
Footballers from Zaragoza
Association football forwards
La Liga players
Segunda División players
Segunda División B players
Tercera División players
Real Zaragoza B players
Real Zaragoza players
Villarreal CF players
Orihuela CF players
CF Palencia footballers
English Football League players
Wigan Athletic F.C. players
Primeira Liga players
G.D. Chaves players
C.F. Os Belenenses players
Spain under-21 international footballers
Spanish expatriate footballers
Expatriate footballers in England
Expatriate footballers in Portugal
Expatriate footballers in Andorra
Spanish expatriate sportspeople in England
Spanish expatriate sportspeople in Portugal
Spanish expatriate sportspeople in Andorra